Yograj Singh (born 25 March 1958) is an Indian actor and the former cricketer who played one Test and six One Day Internationals for India as a right-arm fast-medium bowler. His debut Test was at Wellington against New Zealand which India lost by 62 runs. After his career was ended by injury, he entered  Punjabi cinema and Hindi cinema. His son Yuvraj Singh was a member of the Indian cricket team from 2000 to 2019. Yograj hails from the village of Kanech, right next to Doraha, in Ludhiana District of Punjab.

He has worked in Bollywood movies like Teen Thay Bhai, Singh is Bling and Bhaag Milkha Bhaag.

Personal life
Singh married Shabnam Kaur, but later divorced her. Their elder son Yuvraj Singh is a former Indian cricketer. His another son is Zoravar Singh. In 2011, His son Yuvraj was diagnosed with cancer and recovered from it. Yograj's behaviour was harsh towards his son Yuvraj, during his childhood. He divorced his wife Shabnam. After his divorce, his son Yuvraj decided to live with his mother. Later he married Satbir Kaur.

Controversies 
Yograj Singh criticised and alleged then Indian team captain MS Dhoni for spoiling his son, Yuvraj Singh's career. According to Singh, due to Dhoni, Yuvraj was dropped from 2015 ODI World Cup team.

In 2020, Singh accused Virat Kohli for not supporting Yuvraj and 'backstabbing' him.

Filmography
 Batwara (1983) ... Jarnail 
 Yaar Gareeba Daa (1986) ... Ranjeet
 Jatt Te Zameen (1987) ... Succhaaa
 Anakh Jattan Dee (1990) ... Sheru
 Qurbani Jatt Di (1990) ... Jora
 Jatt Punjab Da (1990) ... Balwant 
 Dushmani Di Agg (1990) ... Sheru 
 Jorr Jatt Daa (1991) ... Jaildar Zora 
 Badla Jatti Da ......Jaildaar Jung Singh
 Subedaar (1991) ... Kashmeera
 Jagga Daaku (1991) ... Jagga 
 Shefali Ki Jawani (1992) ... Dalla
 Putt Sardaran De (1992) ... Jageera
 Lalkara Jatti Da (1992) ... Dulla
 Saali Adhi Ghar Waali (1992) 
 Pagadi Sambhaal Jatta (1992) ... Rathore Singh 
 Mehndi Shagna Di (1992) ... Lambardaar 
 Jora Jatt (1992) ... Jora
 Jigra Jatt Da (1992) ... Bakhtaawar 'Bakhtaura'
Insaaf Ki Devi (1992) ... Inspector Ajay singh (Hindi movie)
 Kudi Canada Di (1993) 
 Jid Jattan Di (1993) ... Jabar Singh 'Jabraa'
 Insaaf Punjab Daa (1993) ... Jagirdar Shamsher Singh/Dulla (dual role)
 Vairi (1994) ... Thanedaar Karam Singh 
 Lalkare Sheran De (1994) ... Shera 
 Vichhora (1994) ... Deep 
 Kachehri (1994) ... Shamsher 
 Jakhmi Jagirdar (1995) Uday Singh/Shera (dual role)
 Nain Preeto De (1995) 
 Kabzaa (1995) ... Surjit 
 Panchayat (1996) ... Thanedaar Baghel Singh
 Zakhmi Sher (1995) 
 Jatt Sucha Singh Soorma (1996) ... Succha 
 Wasiyat (1997) 
 Tera Mera Pyar (1999) ... Mirza 
 Mahaul Theek Hai (1999) ... Daaku Shera
 Sikandera (2001) ... Sheru
 Babal Da Vehra (2008) ... Sampuran Singh Sidhu 
 Luv U Bobby (2009) ... Shamsher Singh 
 West Is West (2010) ... Customs Official  
 Teen Thay Bhai (2011) ... Kheterpal Gill (Hindi movie) 
 Yaraan Naal Baharaan 2 (2012) 
 Oye Hoye Pyar Ho Gaya (2013) ... Shamsher Singh 
 Bhaag Milkha Bhaag (2013) ... Coach Ranveer Singh (Hindi movie)
 Young Malang (2013) ... Maulla Jatt 
 Heer & Hero (2013) 
 Kirpaan: The Sword of Honour (2014) 
 Romeo Ranjha (2014) 
 Baaz (2014) 
 Goreyan Nu Daffa Karo (2014) Naajar Singh
 Ishq Vich: You Never Know (2015’
 Singh Is Bliing (2015) ... Raftaar's father (Hindi movie)
 Love Punjab (2016) ... Sarpanch (Pargat's Father)
 25 Kille (2016) ... Bachittar Singh 
 Tiger (2016) 
 Teshan (2016) 
 Motor Mitraan Di (2016) ... Baba
 The Great Sardaar (2017) ... Haakam Singh Sarpanch 
 Krazzy Tabbar (2017) ... Sandhu
 Channa Mereya (2017) ... MLA's Father
 Raja Abroadiya  (2018) ... Succha Singh 
 Sajjan Singh Rangroot (2018) ... Zorawar Singh 
 Kande (2018) ... Chandu Pehalwan
 Jagga Jiunda E (2018) ... MLA
 Aish Kar Lai (2019) ...
 Dulla Vaily (2019) ... Buggar Singh 
 Vadda Kalaakar (2019) ...
 Ardaas Karaan (2019)
 Teri Meri Jodi (2019) Haakam Singh
 Saadi Marji (2019)
 Doorbeen (2019)
Darbar (2020)... The head of the gangsters
Chandigarh Kare Aashiqui(2021)... Guruji
Apne Ghar Bigane (2022) Being filmed in Calgary

References

External links 
 
 

1958 births
Living people
India One Day International cricketers
India Test cricketers
Haryana cricketers
Indian Universities cricketers
North Zone cricketers
Indian male film actors
Punjab, India cricketers
Male actors in Punjabi cinema
Cricketers from Chandigarh
Indian cricket coaches
Male actors from Chandigarh
Cricketers who have acted in films
21st-century Indian male actors
20th-century Indian male actors
Indian Sikhs
Indian male voice actors